Alison Lukan is an American ice hockey broadcaster and sportswriter. She is currently an analyst on Root Sports Northwest for the Seattle Kraken. Lukan has previously written for The Athletic about the Columbus Blue Jackets and about Ohio State Buckeyes men's and women's hockey. She contributes "Analytics with Alison" articles for the Kraken for the National Hockey League's official website.

Early life and education
Lukan grew up in Columbus, Ohio. She attended the University of Richmond, where she received a bachelor's degree in 1996 from the Jepson School of Leadership Studies. For two years, she performed as the mascot of the Richmond Spiders.

Career
Lukan has worked for Fox Sports Ohio. She joined The Athletic in 2017 to cover the Columbus Blue Jackets. She gained attention for her technically savvy approach to sports analytics, including attendance at hockey analytics conferences and teaching herself R. She organized the Columbus Blue Jackets Hockey Analytics Conference and has been nicknamed the "analytics queen" for being one of the few visible women in her profession. She has co-hosted Too Many Men, a women-run podcast about hockey.

Lukan joined the Seattle Kraken's broadcast team for its inaugural season. She writes articles for the team's official website, provides analysis on the radio, and presents data visualizations on Root Sports Northwest's coverage during pre-game, intermission, and post-game segments. For road games starting on March 5, 2022, she joined John Forslund as an analyst in the television broadcast booth for the Kraken while primary analyst J. T. Brown was in COVID-19 protocols.

The Kraken announced in August 2022 that Lukan would return to the broadcast team during the 2022–23 season.

References

External links
 

Seattle Kraken announcers
American women sportswriters
Sportswriters from Ohio
American sports studio analysts
University of Richmond alumni
Year of birth missing (living people)
Living people